Klaus Uwe Benneter (born 1 March 1947) is a German politician of the Social Democratic Party (SPD).

Education and early life 
Benneter was born in Karlsruhe. After finishing High School in Karlsruhe in 1966, Benneter studied law, economics and political science at the Free University of Berlin from, passing examinations in 1971 and 1974. From 1971 to 1976 he worked as a lecturer at the School of Economics in Berlin. From 1975, he has worked as a lawyer.

Political career 
Benneter joined the SPD in 1965. He was Vice-Chairman of the SPD youth wing from 1974 to 1977, becoming Chairman in 1977. Expelled from the SPD in 1977, he rejoined in 1983 and served as treasurer from 1990 to 1996 and thereafter deputy chairman of the Berlin SPD until 2000.

From 1999 to 2002, Benneter was a member of the Berlin House of Representatives. In 2002 he was elected to the Bundestag representing Berlin-Steglitz-Zehlendorf. Since November 2005, Benneter is legal adviser of the SPD parliamentary group. He lost his constituency seat at the 2005 election but returned to the parliament as a list member for Berlin region. He contested the Steglitz-Zehlendorf seat again at the 2009 election. 
On 27 September, he lost his mandate, just missing the return to the Bundestag via the party list by a few percentage points, being at list position 5. He has since returned to practicing law.

Other activities
 German Orient Foundation, Member of the Board of Trustees
 Friedrich Ebert Foundation (FES), Member of the Board of Trustees

Personal life
Benneter is widowed and has one son.

References

External links 

1947 births
Living people
Politicians from Karlsruhe
Members of the Bundestag for Berlin
Free University of Berlin alumni
Members of the Bundestag 2005–2009
Members of the Bundestag 2002–2005
Members of the Bundestag for the Social Democratic Party of Germany